Keshrim Boztayev (born 25 June 1933, Akchatau, Kazakhstan) is a Kazakh political activist working to attain health care for those affected by the Soviet nuclear test program.

Biography
Boztayev was born 25 June 1933 in Akchatau village in Ayagoz district in Semipalatinsk region. He studied at the Kazakh Mining and Metallurgy Institute as metallurgy engineer. After graduation he worked in the positions of refiner, senior melter, shift master, process engineer, workshop manager.

Career

Professional and academic
Bozyatev was a full-fledged member of the Academy of National Security Problems research since 1997 (Moscow), an academician of National Academy “Ecology”, an Honorary Citizen of Semipalatinsk town, and Professor emeritus of Semipalatinsk Medical Academy.

Political 
Boztayev rose through the ranks of the Kazakh Communist Party:
 Party committee secretary of Ust-Kamenogorsk lead and zinc plant (1956–1973)
 Secretary, Second Secretary of East-Kazakhstan Regional Party Committee(1973–1985)
 Chairman of East-Kazakhstan Executive Regional Committee (1985–1987)
 First Secretary of Semipalatinsk Regional Committee of Communist party (1987–1991)
 Chairman of Semipalatinsk Regional people’s deputies Council (1990–1993)
 People’s deputy of USSR (1989–1991)
 Member of Defense and National Security Committee of Supreme Soviet of USSR (1989–1991)
 Deputy of Supreme Soviet of Kazakh SSR of 11th convention.
 1996-1999 – chairman of Foundation Council “Polygon – 29 August”

He thrice received the Order of the Red Banner of Labour, as well as various medals, Certificates of Honour, and certificates of merit, and was an Honoured Official of Republic of Kazakhstan.

Author
Boztayev is the author of several books: 
 From first fire to atom (1956)
 Experience of integrated usage of raw materials in Ust-Kamenogorsk lead and zinc plant (1972)
 Semipalatinsk Polygon (1992), republished in 2006
 Kaynar syndrome (1995)
 Polygon – 29 August (1998), republished in Japan.

Activism
Boztayev made huge contribution in industrial development of East-Kazakhstan and Semipalatinsk regions. One of the first, he exclaimed against continuation of nuclear weapons tests o Semipalatinsk Nuclear Test site (coded telegram to Central Committee of the Communist Party of the USSR addressed to M.S. Gorbachev, 20 February 1989), which was the first official document for stopping nuclear tests. Despite the resistance of military–industrial complex of USSR, which supported continuation of nuclear tests, Boztayev consistently and persistently pursued policy for ending tests for two and a half years.

On 29 August 1991 Semipalatinsk Nuclear test site was closed by the Decree of the President of Kazakhstan, Nursultan Nazarbaev. While being first secretary of Semipalatinsk regional committee of Communistic Party of Kazakhstan, he supported democratic reforms in late 1980s in Kazakhstan, and anti-nuclear movement “Nevada-Semipalatinsk”, which later on emerged in powerful international movement for the closure of nuclear test site.

Boztayev requested the Russian Military industrial complex to declassify materials regarding the effects of nuclear tests and to transfer this information to Kazakhstan. He also sought financial aid to the region of the Semipalatinsk polygon and improvement of the socio-economic conditions of the population. He also insisted on creation and operation of a special commission for radio-ecological and health assessment of residents of region.

Based on the results of a state commission, an important decision was made: materials concerning ecological effects by nuclear tests were declassified and transferred to Kazakhstan. At the same time, instructions for the creation of an expert medical and social assessment commission and conference were given. Based on the initiative of Boztayev, the first All Soviet Union “Health of the population and ecological situation in Semipalatinsk region” Conference was conducted 17–19 July 1989 in Semipalatinsk; it revealed to the world for the first time the consequences of nuclear tests.  It was at this conference that the Resolution for closing Semipalatinsk nuclear test site was adopted.

Boztayev is an author and initiator of the “Social protection of citizens who suffered as a result of nuclear tests conducted in Semipalatinsk nuclear test site” law passed 18 December 1992. In 1996, Boztayev, along with several famous public figures of Kazakhstan, organized the international charitable foundation “Polygon – 29 August”

Boztayev created a program of medical rehabilitation for sufferers from nuclear explosions (Kazakhstan Government decree № 336, 17.03.1997), and one of the first to drawing attention and practical aid of the world community to the problems of suffered population of Semey region. The "Polygon - 29 August" fund was one of initiators of resolutions 52 and 53 passed in sessions of General Assembly of UN in 1997-1998. The Fund received Roster Consultative status with the Economic and Social Council of the United Nation (ECOSOC) in 2002.

References

Kazakhstani activists
Living people
1933 births